Alain Poiré (13 February 1917 – 14 January 2000) was a French film producer and screenwriter. He was born in Paris, and died in Neuilly-Sur-Seine.

Life and career
Alain Poiré graduated from law school and worked for advertising group Havas. In 1938, he moved to working for the film company Société Nouvelle des Etablissements Gaumont (SNEG) as assistant general manager in order to save the company from financial disaster. SNEG was renamed Gaumont Film Company in 1975. Always passionate about cinema, he didn't leave Gaumont until his death in 2000, becoming one of the most prolific producers in French cinema, particularly from the 1950s on.

As producer at Gaumont and manager of Gaumont International, Alain Poiré produced more than 200 films. His final film, released after his death, was La Vache et le President.

Poiré and his wife Yvette had two sons, Phillipe and Jean-Marie Poiré. He died of cancer at age 82.

Filmography (producer)
 1948: Les Casse-pieds by Jean Dréville
 1950: Tuesday's Guest by Jacques Deval
 1950: The Girl from Maxim's by Marcel Aboulker
 1951: Darling Caroline by Richard Pottier
 1951: The Beautiful Image by Claude Heymann
 1951: La Vie chantée by Noël-Noël
 1951: La Plus belle fille du monde by Christian Stengel
 1952: Ouvert contre X by Richard Pottier
 1953: A Caprice of Darling Caroline by Jean Devaivre
 1953: Capitaine Pantoufle by Guy Lefranc
 1954: Le Défroqué by Léo Joannon
 1954: Les Révoltés de Lomanach by Richard Pottier
 1954: Service Entrance by Carlo Rim
 1955: Le Fils de Caroline chérie by Jean Devaivre
 1955: Le Fil à la patte by Guy Lefranc
 1955: Les Aristocrates by Denys de La Patellière
 1955: Marguerite de la nuit by Claude Autant-Lara
 1955: Les Carnets du Major Thompson by Preston Sturges
 1956: Un condamné à mort s'est échappé (aka. Le vent souffle où il veut) by Robert Bresson
 1956: Assassins et voleurs by Sacha Guitry
 1957: Action immédiate by Maurice Labro
 1957: Le rouge est mis by Gilles Grangier
 1957: Les Aventures d'Arsène Lupin by Jacques Becker
 1957: La Peau de l'ours by Claude Boissol
 1957: Nathalie by Christian-Jaque
 1958:  by Édouard Molinaro
 1958: And Your Sister? by Maurice Delbez
 1958: Le Miroir à deux faces by André Cayatte
 1958: Tant d'amour perdu by Léo Joannon
 1959: Moana by Raymond Lamy (documentary)
 1959: Un témoin dans la ville by Édouard Molinaro
 1959: La Nuit des espions by Robert Hossein
 1959: Signé Arsène Lupin by Yves Robert
 1959: La Verte moisson by François Villiers
 1960: Tendre et violente Elisabeth by Henri Decoin
 1962: L'Assassin est dans l'annuaire by Léo Joannon
 1963: Méfiez-vous, mesdames by André Hunebelle
 1963: Jusqu'au bout du monde by François Villiers
 1963: Carambolages by Marcel Bluwal
 1963: Le Vice et la vertu by Roger Vadim
 1963: Les Tontons flingueurs by Georges Lautner
 1964: Le Gentleman de Cocody by Christian-Jaque
 1964: Cent mille dollars au soleil by Henri Verneuil
 1964: Fantômas by André Hunebelle
 1964: Les Barbouzes by Georges Lautner
 1965: Quand passent les faisans by Édouard Molinaro
 1965: Piège pour Cendrillon by André Cayatte
 1965: Fantômas se déchaîne by André Hunebelle
 1966: Trois enfants... dans le désordre by Léo Joannon
 1966: Le Grand Restaurant by Jacques Besnard
 1966:  by Georges Lautner
 1967: Un idiot à Paris by Serge Korber
 1967: Fantômas contre Scotland Yard by André Hunebelle
 1967: Peau d'espion by Édouard Molinaro
 1967: Oscar by Édouard Molinaro
 1967: Les Risques du métier by André Cayatte
 1967: Le fou du labo 4 by Jacques Besnard
 1968: Leontine by Michel Audiard
 1968: Le Pacha by Georges Lautner
 1969: Clérambard by Yves Robert
 1969: Le cri du cormoran le soir au-dessus des jonques by Michel Audiard
 1969: Le Cerveau by Gérard Oury
 1969: Hibernatus by Édouard Molinaro
 1969: Mon oncle Benjamin by Edouard Molinaro
 1970: Elle boit pas, elle fume pas, elle drague pas, mais... elle cause! by Michel Audiard
 1970: Le Distrait by Pierre Richard
 1970: L'homme orchestre by Serge Korber
 1971: Les Mariés de l'an II by Jean-Paul Rappeneau
 1971: Boulevard du Rhum by Robert Enrico
 1971: La Folie des grandeurs by Gérard Oury
 1972:  by Georges Lautner
 1972: Les Malheurs d'Alfred by Pierre Richard
 1972: Le grand blond avec une chaussure noire by Yves Robert
 1973: La Valise by Georges Lautner
 1973: Le Silencieux by Claude Pinoteau
 1973: Mais où est donc passée la septième compagnie? by Robert Lamoureux
 1973: Quelques messieurs trop tranquilles by Georges Lautner
 1974: Comment réussir quand on est con et pleurnichard by Michel Audiard
 1974: Comme un pot de fraises by Jean Aurel
 1974: La Gifle by Claude Pinoteau
 1974: Le Retour du grand blond by Yves Robert
 1975: L'Agression by Gérard Pirès
 1975: Pas de problème ! by Georges Lautner
 1975: Le Téléphone rose by Édouard Molinaro
 1975: On a retrouvé la septième compagnie by Robert Lamoureux
 1976: Le Pays bleu by Jean-Charles Tacchella
 1976: On aura tout vu by Georges Lautner
 1976: Dracula père et fils by Édouard Molinaro
 1976: Un éléphant ça trompe énormément by Yves Robert
 1977: Le Maestro by Claude Vital
 1977: Monsieur Papa by Philippe Monnier
 1977: Gloria by Claude Autant-Lara
 1977: Nous irons tous au paradis by Yves Robert
 1978: L'Hôtel de la plage by Michel Lang
 1978: Les petits câlins by Jean-Marie Poiré
 1978: La Carapate by Gérard Oury
 1979: Le Temps des vacances by Claude Vital
 1979: Coup de tête by Jean-Jacques Annaud
 1979: Flic ou voyou by Georges Lautner
 1979: Courage - Let's Run by Yves Robert
 1980: Retour en force by Jean-Marie Poiré
 1980: Le Guignolo by Georges Lautner
 1980: Le Coup du parapluie by Gérard Oury
 1980: The Wonderful Day by Claude Vital
 1980: La Boum by Claude Pinoteau
 1981: Clara et les Chics Types by Jacques Monnet
 1981: On n'est pas des anges... elles non-plus by Michel Lang
 1981: La Chèvre by Francis Veber
 1982: L'As des as by Gérard Oury
 1982: La Boum 2 by Claude Pinoteau
 1983: L'Été de nos 15 ans by Marcel Jullian
 1984: La Septième Cible by Claude Pinoteau
 1984: P'tit Con by Gérard Lauzier
 1986: Jean de Florette by Claude Berri
 1986: Je hais les acteurs by Gérard Krawczyk
 1986: Twist again à Moscou by Jean-Marie Poiré
 1986: Manon des sources by Claude Berri
 1987:  by Gérard Oury
 1987: Promis... juré ! by Jacques Monnet
 1988: L'Étudiante by Claude Pinoteau
 1989: La Vouivre by Georges Wilson
 1989: L'Invité surprise by Georges Lautner
 1990: La Gloire de mon père by Yves Robert
 1990: Le Château de ma mère by Yves Robert
 1992:  by Yves Robert
 1993: Cuisine et dépendances by Philippe Muyl
 1993: La Soif de l'or by Gérard Oury
 1994: Cache cash by Claude Pinoteau
 1994: Pourquoi maman est dans mon lit ? by Patrick Malakian
 1996: Fantôme avec chauffeur by Gérard Oury
 1996: Les Victimes by Patrick Grandperret
 1996: Le Jaguar by Francis Veber
 1998: Le Dîner de Cons by Francis Veber
 1999: Le Schpountz by Gérard Oury

See also
 Gaumont Film Company

References

External links
 Alain Poiré on Internet Movie Database

1917 births
2000 deaths
French film producers
Film people from Paris
César Honorary Award recipients